Double Bullseye may mean:

 Double Bullseye, or Inner Bullseye (target)
Double Bull in Darts
 Double Bullseye, a pricing game in The Price Is Right

See also
Bullseye (disambiguation)
Fresnel lens